The Demon is a 1918 American silent comedy film, directed by George D. Baker. It stars Edith Storey, Lewis Cody, and Charles K. Gerrard, and was released on July 22, 1918.

Cast list
 Edith Storey as Princess Perdita
 Lewis Cody as Jim Lassells
 Charles K. Gerrard as Tom Reardon
Virginia Chester as Lady Lilah Grey
 Mollie McConnell as The Duchess of Westgate
Laura Winston as Aissa
 Fred Malatesta as Count Theodore de Seramo
 Frank Deshon as Prince Lorenzo di Rivoli
Alice Knowland as Señorita Selina Rossi
 Anne Schaefer as Señorita Agatha Rossi

References

External links 
 
 
 

Metro Pictures films
Films directed by George D. Baker
American silent feature films
American black-and-white films
Silent American comedy films
1918 comedy films
1918 films
Films based on American novels
Films based on British novels
Films based on works by Alice Williamson
1910s English-language films
1910s American films